Valentine Stockdale (born 15 December 1981) is an English film producer, screenwriter and executive producer.

Early life
He was born in London, and raised in the English counties of Northumberland, Northamptonshire, Sussex and Lincolnshire.  He became a member of Mensa International aged 12 and was educated at Eton College specializing in graphic design, physics and mathematics.

Screenwriting
His commissioned feature screenplays to date include 'The Good War' scheduled for production in Malta in 2010 starring Alfred Molina, Ed Speleers and Ian Virgo; 'Brodie's Law' the gruesome graphic novel adaptation from infamous comic book publisher Pulp Theatre; and a comedy musical studio picture from Firefly. He currently has several further screenplays in development through Vesuvius Film Partners including a Russian espionage thriller studio picture, an Argentine political thriller and a horror movie. Most recently his screenplay 'Gabriel-Ernest' was the Winner of five accolades including Winner at the A Night of Horror International Film Festival 2011, a Semi-Finalist in the PAGE International Screenwriting Awards, and a Finalist in the European Independent Film Festival 2010.

Film producer
He began his early days in film as an Assistant Director and Production Manager after many years working on commercials and music videos for the multi-award-winning UK production companies Rose Hackney Barber, Bliss Films, Great Guns, Oil Factory, Wall2Wall, Own2Feet & Godman. In 2007 he joined new media group Universal 360 as an Executive Producer and began developing and producing feature films and television programs for leading UK independent Firefly. He also served for 10 months as an Executive Producer at London-based music TV production company Oberon.

In 2008 he founded London based film finance company Vesuvius Film Partners, providing finance for feature-length independent and studio motion pictures including consultancy services, medium to high budget fundraising services, seed capital, bridge loans, mezzanine finance, GAP finance, and the structuring of commercial transactions and investments through tax incentive schemes. In early 2009 he became Head of Acquisitions and Co-productions at Firefly. In mid-2009 Stockdale left Firefly to concentrate full-time on motion picture finance, joining Capital Motion Pictures, a fund of funds providing match finance to major Hollywood studios. Stockdale also serves as a freelance adviser and Executive Producer at 8 times BAFTA nominated, 3 times BAFTA winning Aquarium Studios based in London.

Films
Most notably he is Executive Producer of Boogie Woogie starring Heather Graham, Danny Huston, Christopher Lee, Amanda Seyfried, Gillian Anderson, Stellan Skarsgård, Joanna Lumley, Simon McBurney, Charlotte Rampling, Jamie Winstone and Alan Cumming, a black comedy about the British art industry directed by Duncan Ward and the first motion picture featuring the work of infamous curator Damien Hirst. The film was released in March 2010 by Vertigo Films and IFC.

He is also Executive Producer of Lionsgate's Jack Falls, the final installment of the first ever British film trilogy, particularly reminiscent of the Robert Rodriguez classic Sin City; and King Kennedy, a feature-length drama/thriller set in the 1960s made entirely from archive material. The film stars some of the most prominent characters from 1960's America, including US President John F. Kennedy, Robert F. Kennedy, civil rights movement leader Martin Luther King Jr., convicted assassins Lee Harvey Oswald and Sirhan Sirhan, and the film world icons Marilyn Monroe and Frank Sinatra. The plot line revolves around the concepts of truth and freedom, but pursues further towards deception, intrigue, conspiracy and murder, and features some of the most memorable moments in 1960's America, including Marilyn Monroe's world-famous "Happy Birthday, Mr. President" at Madison Square Garden and King's 1963 "I Have A Dream" speech, at the March on Washington for Jobs and Freedom, in which he called for racial equality and an end to discrimination. The film is designed primarily to remind, focusing on the characters and events that build up to the assassination of John F. Kennedy, assassination of Martin Luther King Jr., and the assassination of Robert F. Kennedy, as their apparent determination to shy away from war, discrimination and hatred became ever more publicized.

Media consulting
In addition to his producing work, Valentine has served as a senior consultant at Mayfair-based investment and corporate advisory firm Buchler Rothschild Investments, providing corporate strategy, fundraising and business advisory services to clients in the media arena. Valentine is also a partner at corporate finance and commodities trading organization HSW Finance, providing financial instruments and fundraising services to clients in the international commodities trading industries.

Trivia
He is the first cousin of George Roy Hill, Academy Award-winning director of Butch Cassidy and the Sundance Kid and The Sting and the grandson of Sir Edmund Villiers Minshull Stockdale, 1st Baronet (Lord Mayor of the City of London, 1959) and The Hon. Louise Fermor-Hesketh. On 26 April 2008 he married Martha Judith Torres Chávez in London.  His son Gabriel Angelo Dante Stockdale was born in London on 16 May 2008.

Filmography

References

External links

BBC Film Network

1981 births
Living people
People educated at Eton College
British male screenwriters
British film producers
English film producers
English businesspeople
Mensans